Route 695 is a local highway located in south central New Brunswick.

Major junctions

See also
List of New Brunswick provincial highways

References

New Brunswick provincial highways
Roads in Kings County, New Brunswick
Roads in Queens County, New Brunswick